Montenegrins in Croatia may refer to:

 Montenegrins of Croatia, an ethnic minority in Croatia
 Citizens of Montenegro, living or working in Croatia

See also
 Croatia-Montenegro relations
 Montenegrins (disambiguation)
 Montenegro (disambiguation)